Craig Glassock (born 29 November 1973) is an Australian cricketer. He played four first-class and one List A match for New South Wales between 1994/95 and 1997/98.

See also
 List of New South Wales representative cricketers

References

External links
 

1973 births
Living people
Australian cricketers
New South Wales cricketers
Cricketers from Sydney